The Wilzsch is a river in Saxony, Germany. It is a right tributary of the Zwickauer Mulde, which it joins near Schönheide.

See also
List of rivers of Saxony

Rivers of Saxony
Rivers of Germany